The Chairperson of the African Union Commission is the head of the African Union Commission. On January 30, 2017, it was announced that Chad's Moussa Faki would become the further chairperson.

History

List

See also
Chairperson of the African Union

References